Telemundo is an American Spanish-language broadcast television television network owned by NBCUniversal which was launched in 1984 under the name NetSpan. , the network currently has 28 owned-and-operated stations and current affiliation agreements with 66 other television stations. Telemundo maintains a national cable network feed that is distributed directly to cable, satellite and IPTV providers in various media markets not listed in this article, as an alternative method of distribution in areas without either the availability or the demand for a locally based owned-and-operated or affiliate station.

This article is a listing of current Telemundo affiliates in the continental United States and U.S. possessions (including subchannel affiliates, satellite stations and select low-power translators), arranged alphabetically by state, and based on the station's city of license and followed in parentheses by the Designated Market Area if it differs from the city of license. Also included is a listing of Fox-branded cable channels outside the United States. There are links to and articles on each of the broadcast stations and international channels, describing their histories, local programming and technical information, such as broadcast frequencies.

The station's advertised channel number follows the call letters. In most cases, this is their virtual channel (PSIP) number.

Stations listed in boldface are owned and operated by Telemundo through NBCUniversal's broadcasting subsidiary Telemundo Station Group.

United States

U.S. states

Alabama
 Birmingham – WTBM-CD 24.1
Huntsville - WTHV-LD 29.1

Alaska
 Anchorage – KDMD-DT 33.2

Arizona
 Phoenix – KTAZ 39
 Tucson – KHRR 40
 Yuma – KESE-LD 35

Arkansas
 Fayetteville (Fort Smith) – KAJL-LD 16
 Hot Springs (Little Rock) – KQPS-LD 14

California
 Bakersfield – KKEY-LP 13 / KGET-DT 17.3 (simulcast of KKEY-LP)
 Chico (Redding) – KNVN-DT2 24.2
 Corona (Los Angeles) – KVEA 52
 El Centro (Yuma, Arizona) – KECY-DT 9.4 (simulcast of KESE-LD, Yuma, Arizona)
 Clovis (Fresno) – KNSO 51
 Monterey (Salinas) – KMUV-LD 23
 Palm Desert – KUNA-LD 15
 Palm Springs – KESQ-DT 42.7 (simulcast of KUNA-LD)
 Poway (San Diego) – KUAN-LD 48
 Sacramento – KCSO-LD 33 / KMUM-CD 15 (simulcast of KCSO-LD)
 San Jose (San Francisco) – KSTS 48
 Santa Maria, San Luis Obispo (Santa Barbara) – KCOY-TV 12

Colorado
 Colorado Springs – KTLO-LD 49 / KRDO-DT 13.2 (simulcast of KTLO-LD)
 Grand Junction – KKCO-DT 11.3
 Longmont (Denver) – KDEN-TV 25

Connecticut
 Hartford – WRDM-CD 50

Delaware

 None; served by WWSI Atlantic City, New Jersey and WBOC-LD Cambridge, Maryland

District of Columbia
 Washington, D.C. – WZDC-CD 44

Florida
 Fort Lauderdale (Miami) – WSCV 51
 Jacksonville – WFOX-DT 30.4
 Naples (Fort Myers) – WWDT-CD 43
 Orlando – WTMO-CD 31 / WRDQ 31.2 (standard-definition simulcast of WTMO-CD)
 Tampa – WRMD-CD 49

Georgia
 Baxley (Savannah) – WSCG-DT 35.4
 Norcross (Atlanta) – WKTB-CD 47.2 / WPXA-DT 47.7 (standard-definition simulcast of WKTB-CD)

Hawaii
 Kailua-Kona (Honolulu) – KFVE 6.1

Idaho
 Boise – KKJB 39
 Idaho Falls – KIFI-DT 8.2

Illinois
 Chicago – WSNS-TV 44
 Rockford – WFBN-LD 33 (simulcast of WYTU-LD/Milwaukee)

Indiana
 Evansville – WYYW-CD 15
 Indianapolis – WDNI-CD 19
 South Bend – WMYS-LD 69.2 (simulcast of WYTU-LD/Milwaukee)

Iowa

Kansas
 Garden City/Dodge City– KSNG-DT 11.2 (satellite of KSNW)
 Great Bend/Hays/Salina – KSNC-DT 2.2 (satellite of KSNW)
 Lawrence (Kansas City, Missouri) – KGKC-LD 39
 Wichita/Hutchinson – KSNW-DT 3.2

Kentucky
Bowling Green – WBGS-LD 34

Louisiana
 Hammond (New Orleans) – KGLA-DT 42

Maine

Maryland
 Cambridge (Salisbury) – WBOC-LD 42.1 / WSJZ-LD 42.3 (simulcast of WBOC-LD)

Massachusetts
 Springfield – WDMR-LD 50 (simulcast of WRDM-CD)

Michigan

Minnesota
 Minneapolis – KJNK-LD 25

Mississippi

Missouri
 Columbia/Jefferson City – KGKM-LD 36 (semi-satellite of KGKC-LD Lawrence, Kansas/Kansas City, Missouri)

Montana

Nebraska
Lincoln – KFDY-LD 27.1 (simulcast of KOHA-LD)
McCook (Colby/Goodland/Oberlin, Kansas) – KSNK-DT 8.2 (satellite of KSNW)
Omaha – KOHA-LD 27.1

Nevada
 Incline Village (Reno) – KXNV-LD 26
 Paradise (Las Vegas) – KBLR 39

New Hampshire
 Merrimack (Boston, Massachusetts) – WNEU 60

New Jersey
 Atlantic City (Philadelphia, Pennsylvania) – WWSI 62
 Linden (New York City, New York) – WNJU 47

New Mexico
 Santa Fe (Albuquerque)  – KASA-TV 2
 Las Cruces - KTDO 48

New York
 none

North Carolina
 Charlotte – WSOC-DT 9.2
 Raleigh -  WRTD-CD 54

North Dakota

Ohio
 Cleveland – WTCL-LD 6.1
 Columbus – WQMC-LD 23.3

Oklahoma
 Lawton (Wichita Falls, Texas) – KSWO-DT 7.2
 Shawnee (Oklahoma City) – KTUZ-TV 30
 Tulsa – KUTU-CD 25.2

Oregon
 Bend – KQRE-LP 20 / KFXO-CD 39.2
 Medford – KFBI-LD 48.2
 Portland - KJYY-LD 29.1
 Salem - KJWY-LD 21.1

Pennsylvania
 none

Rhode Island
 Providence – WRIW-CD 50 / WYCN-LD 8

South Carolina
 Sumter (Columbia) – WKTC-DT2 63.2

South Dakota

Tennessee
Knoxville - WBXX-DT5 20.5
Nashville - WTNX-LD 15.1

Texas
 Abilene – KTAB-DT 32.2
 Amarillo – KFDA-DT 10.3 (simulcast of KEYU)
 Austin – KEYE-DT 42.2
 Big Spring – KCWO-DT 4.2 (simulcast of KTLE-LD)
 Borger (Amarillo) – KEYU 31
 Dallas – KXTX-TV 39
 El Paso – KTDO 48
 Galveston (Houston) – KTMD 47
 Laredo – KGNS-DT 8.3
 Lubbock – KXTQ-CD 46 / KLCW-DT2 (simulcast of KXTQ-CD)
 Lufkin – KTRE-DT 9.2 (satellite of KLTV)
 Odessa – KOSA-DT 7.1 (simulcast of KTLE-LD)
 Odessa – KTLE-LD 7.5
 Rio Grande City (Brownsville) – KTLM 40
 San Antonio – KVDA 60
 Tyler – KLTV-DT 7.3
 Victoria – KVTX-LD 45
 Waco – KXXV-DT 25.2

Utah
 Salt Lake City – KTMW 20

Vermont

Virginia
 Richmond – WZTD-LD 45

Washington
 Pasco/Richland/Kennewick – KFFX-DT 11.2
 Seattle – KIRO-DT 7.4
 Yakima - KCYU-LD 41.2

West Virginia

Wisconsin
 Milwaukee – WYTU-LD 63 / WDJT-TV 58.4

Wyoming

U.S. territories

Puerto Rico
 Ponce - WTIN-TV 2.11 (satellite of WKAQ-TV)
 Mayagüez – WNJX-TV 2.12 (satellite of WKAQ-TV)
 San Juan – WKAQ-TV 2

Notes and references

Station notes

References

Telemundo